Lysimachia minoricensis is a species of plant in the family Primulaceae. It was endemic to the island of Menorca in Spain. Its natural habitat was Mediterranean-type shrubby vegetation. It became extinct within its natural range due to habitat loss and now only survives in cultivation.

References

minoricensis
Endemic flora of Spain
Extinct plants
Extinct biota of Europe
Taxonomy articles created by Polbot